The Men's 25 km competition of the 2018 European Aquatics Championships was held on 12 August 2018.

Results
The race was started at 09:00.

References

Men's 25 km